Robert Ameerali (born 16 August 1961) is a Surinamese politician who was the Vice President of Suriname from 2010 to 2015. Previously he was the chairman of the Chamber of Commerce (Kamer van Koophandel en Fabrieken). He was nominated by the General Liberation and Development Party (Algemene Bevrijdings- en Ontwikkelingspartij, ABOP), which was founded and is still chaired by Ronnie Brunswijk. He was inaugurated as Vice President on 12 August 2010 and left office on 12 August 2015.

References

1961 births
Living people
Surinamese Muslims
People from Paramaribo
Vice presidents of Suriname
Surinamese politicians of Indian descent
General Liberation and Development Party politicians